Caecidotea macropropoda is a species of crustacean in the family Asellidae. It is endemic to the United States.

References

Crustaceans of the United States
Asellota
Crustaceans described in 1937
Taxonomy articles created by Polbot
Taxobox binomials not recognized by IUCN